Rockhampton State High School is a coeducational public secondary school located in Wandal, a suburb of Rockhampton in Queensland, Australia. The school has a total enrolment of more than 1000 students, with an official count of 1119 students in 2017.

Rockhampton State High School's role of the Principal of the School is currently held by Kirsten Dwyer. The school also consists of three Deputy Principals, twelve Heads of Department, twelve Year Level Coordinators, one Business Services Manager, two Guidance Officers, one School Chaplain, one School Nurse and 70 teaching staff.

History

Rockhampton State High School opened in conjunction with the Rockhampton Technical College in 1919 under the leadership of Founding Principal John Hill, a former Australian Army major who served in Gallipoli and was awarded for his bravery. Major Hill chose the colours of his old army unit, blue and brown, as the school's official colours, as well as the school motto, Aere Perennius, meaning "More lasting than bronze". The high school conducted its classes in buildings in Bolsover Street and Alma Street until 1962, when the school separated from the Technical College and relocated to its present site in Wandal.

Curriculum

English

English is a compulsory core subject across the Junior Secondary and Senior Secondary phases. Students in Years 11 and 12 have the option of undertaking the General subject of English or the Applied subject of Essential English.

Mathematics

Mathematics is a compulsory core subject across the Junior Secondary and Senior Secondary phases. From Years 7–10, Mathematics is administered in the levels of Learning Support Mathematics and Core Mathematics. In Year 10, Mathematics Extension is also offered. Mathematics subjects available to students in Years 11 and 12 include the General subjects of Mathematical Methods, General Mathematics and Specialist Mathematics, and the Applied subject of Essential Mathematics.

Social Science

The Social Science subject of History is administered as a compulsory subject from Years 7–10, whereas Geography is administered in Years 7 and 8. The General Social Science subject of Ancient History is available to students in Years 11 and 12.

Science

Science is a compulsory core subject across the Year 7–10 curriculum. Science subjects available to student in Years 11 and 12 include the General subjects of Biology, Chemistry and Physics, and the Applied subjects of Aquatic Practices and Science in Practice.

Languages

Japanese is the Language Other Than English at Rockhampton State High School, which is administered across the Year 7–12 curriculum.

Health & Physical Education

Health & Physical Education is a compulsory core subject across the Year 7–10 curriculum. In Year 9, students who have previously achieved success in Year 8 Health & Physical Education have the option of participating in the year-long elective subject of Creative Sports. Year 10 students who have previously achieved success in Year 9 Health & Physical Education have the option of participating in the year-long elective subject of Specialist Sports Performance. Health & Physical Education subjects available to students in Years 11 and 12 include the General subjects of Health Education and Physical Education, and the Applied subject of Sport & Recreation.

The Arts

The Arts subjects of Drama and Media are undertaken by all students in Year 7 whereas Year 8 students participate in Visual Art and Music. From Year 9 onwards, Arts subjects are studied as year-long elective subjects. Arts subjects available to students in Years 11 and 12 include the General subjects of Drama, Music and Visual Art, and the Applied subject of Visual Arts in Practice.

Technology

Agriculture

Agriculture is studied as a compulsory subject for one term in Year 7. In Years 9 and 10, Agriculture is studied as a year-long elective subject. Agriculture subjects available to students in Years 11 and 12 include the General subject of Agricultural Practices and the Applied subject of Agricultural Science.

Business & IT/Digital Technologies

In the Junior Secondary phase, the Business & IT subjects of Civics & Citizenship, Digital Technologies, Economics & Business and Programming are administered to students in Year 7, whereas the subjects of Business Studies and Computing are studied as electives in Year 9. In the Senior Secondary Phase, Business & IT subjects available to Year 10 students include Business, Computing, Legal Studies and Programming, whereas Business & IT subjects available to students in Years 11 and 12 include the General subjects of Accounting, Business, Digital Solutions and Legal Studies.

Graphics

Graphics is administered as a year-long elective subject to students in Years 9 and 10.

Home Economics

Home Economics is studied as a compulsory subject for one term in Year 8 and from Year 9 onwards, it is studied as a year-long elective subject. Home Economics subjects available to students in Years 11 and 12 include the General subject of Food & Nutrition and the Applied subjects of Early Childhood Studies and Hospitality Practices.

Manual Arts

Manual Arts is studied as a compulsory subject for one term in Year 8 and from Year 9 onwards, it is studied as a year-long elective subject. The Applied subject of Industrial Technology Skills is available to students in Years 11 and 12.

Vocational Education & Training

Vocational Education & Training (VET) courses available to students in Years 11 and 12 include:
 Certificate II in Business (BSB20115)
 Certificate II in Engineering Pathways (MEM20413)
 Certificate II in Hospitality (SIT20213)
 Certificate II in Rural Operations (AHC21216)
 Certificate II in Sport & Recreation (NRL & Netball) (SIS20313)

Co-curricular activities

Co-curricular activities available to students at Rockhampton State High School include:
 Agricultural showing
 Breakfast Club
 Constitutional Conventions
 Dance and Drama projects and performances
 Ecoman
 Indigenous programs (Academic & Talent Aspirations Program, ARTIE, FOGS and QATSIF)
 Inter-school sports
 Junior Secondary excellence programs
 Keyboarding competitions
 Mathematics, English and Science competitions
 Mathematics Team challenge
 Minister’s Arts Awards
 Mooting
 Pierre de Coubertin Award
 Rockhampton/Capricornia/Queensland/Australia representatives at various sports
 Rotary Quiz
 Year 7 lunchtime activities
 Year 11 leadership camp

Notable alumni

 George Pearce, politician, Member for the Australian Parliament for Capricornia (1949–1961)
 Dave Tollner, politician, Member for the Australian Parliament for Solomon (2001–2007), Member of the Northern Territory Legislative Assembly for Fong Lim (2008–2016), Deputy Chief Minister of the Northern Territory (2013–2014)
 Perc Tucker, member of the Queensland Legislative Assembly; Member for Townsville North (1960–1972), Member for Townsville West (1972–1974), Leader of the Opposition of Queensland (1974)

References

External links

 

Public high schools in Queensland
Schools in Rockhampton
Educational institutions established in 1919
1919 establishments in Australia